The 2004 Navy Midshipmen football team represented the United States Naval Academy (USNA) as an independent during the 2004 NCAA Division I-A football season. The team was led by third-year head coach Paul Johnson. The Midshipmen finished the regular season with a 9–2 record, the first time since the 1963 season that Navy had won nine or more games in a season. Wins over Army and the Air Force Falcons secured Navy's second consecutive Commander-in-Chief's Trophy. Navy secured a berth in the 2004 Emerald Bowl when the Pacific-10 Conference did not have enough teams to fill its bowl obligations. The other tie-in was with the Mountain West Conference (MWC), and the Midshipmen ended up playing the New Mexico Lobos. They won the game with a score of 34–19, finishing with a 14-minute, 26-play drive that set the record for the longest drive in a college football game. The win gave the Midshipmen a final record of 10–2, the first time since the 1905 season that the Midshipmen finished with ten or more wins.

Schedule

References

Navy
Navy Midshipmen football seasons
Redbox Bowl champion seasons
Navy Midshipmen football